The Canon de 305 modèle 93/96 TAZ was a French Railway gun used by the French Army during World War I.

History
Although the majority of combatants had heavy field artillery prior to the outbreak of the First World War, none had adequate numbers of heavy guns in service, nor had they foreseen the growing importance of heavy artillery once the Western Front stagnated and trench warfare set in.  Since aircraft of the period were not yet capable of carrying large diameter bombs the burden of delivering heavy firepower fell on the artillery.  Two sources of heavy artillery suitable for conversion to field use were surplus coastal defense guns and naval guns.  

However, a paradox faced artillery designers of the time; while large caliber naval guns were common, large caliber land weapons were not due to their weight, complexity, and lack of mobility.  Large caliber field guns often required extensive site preparation because the guns had to be broken down into multiple loads light enough to be towed by a horse team or the few traction engines of the time and then reassembled before use.  Building a new gun could address the problem of disassembling, transporting and reassembling a large gun, but it did not necessarily address how to convert existing heavy weapons to make them more mobile.  Rail transport proved to be the most practical solution because the problems of heavy weight, lack of mobility and reduced setup time were addressed.

Design
The Canon de 305 modèle 93/96 TAZ started life as eight surplus Canon de 305 mm Modèle 1893/96 naval guns which armed pre-dreadnought battleships of the Charlemagne, République, and Liberté-class.  The guns were typical built-up guns of the period which consisted of a rifled liner reinforced by layers of hoops.  The guns used a Welin interrupted screw breech and fired separate loading bagged charges and projectiles.  The guns sat on a top carriage traversing mount which sat on a large diameter geared steel ring.  A rectangular steel firing platform sat on top of the platform with the barrel of the gun overhanging the platform at the front with an overhanging loading platform for the gunners to the rear.  The firing platform was then traversed by a worm gear which attached to the base.  To load the gun the barrel was lowered and there was an elevated shell handling trolley at the rear.   

The carriages consisted of rectangular steel bases, which were suspended on two railroad bogies. Each bogie had six axles. Since the barrels were naval guns that were not intended for use at high angles of elevation the trunnions were relocated relatively far forward and the guns were nose heavy. The carriage used ground platform anchoring and site preparation included laying wooden beams parallel to the tracks then splicing in a section of rail bed reinforced with wooden beams under the center which the carriage was lowered onto. Outriggers and ground anchors were also used to stabilize the gun once in firing position as well as screw jacks. Although the mount was capable of 360° of traverse it was often limited to 10° left/right of the centerline because of problems with balance and recoil. Another issue for the mount was that although the gun could be elevated up to +40° it was limited to +20° of elevation when the gun was fired parallel to the tracks due to recoil. For these reasons, the weapon was not considered a success. The carriages were originally deployed in 1916 but it was too much gun for too little carriage so the  barrels were later replaced with  barrels by St Chamond and the Canon de 240 modèle 93/96 TAZ entered service in 1918.

Ammunition 
 APC (Armor Piercing Capped) - 
 CI (Common Incendiary) - 
 SAPC (Semi-Armor Piercing Capped) -

Photo Gallery

References 

Artillery of France
World War I artillery of France
Railway guns
World War I railway artillery of France
World War I guns